is a Japanese footballer who plays as a defender for J2 League club Blaublitz Akita.

Club statistics
Updated to 30 November 2022.

References

External links
Profile at V-Varen Nagasaki
Profile at Matsumoto Yamaga FC
Profile at Sendai
Profile at Akita

1991 births
Living people
Hannan University alumni
Association football people from Hyōgo Prefecture
Japanese footballers
J1 League players
J2 League players
Matsumoto Yamaga FC players
V-Varen Nagasaki players
Vegalta Sendai
Blaublitz Akita players
Association football midfielders